Repo Games is an American game show on Spike. The series debuted on April 26, 2011.

Format
Hosts Josh Lewis and Tom DeTone are actual repo men. They visit actual owners of vehicles in danger of being repossessed and offer them a chance to have the debt fully paid off by playing a trivia game.

The game takes place wherever the vehicle is parked, usually in the owner's driveway. The vehicle is hooked up to a tow truck, and the owner is given a chance to win it back by answering five general-knowledge trivia questions. If the owner can answer three questions correctly, the vehicle is removed from the tow truck and the owner gets it back, with all delinquent payments and any outstanding loan balance paid off by the show. If not, the tow truck drives away with the vehicle. The first series of episodes were filmed in Phoenix, Arizona,  Las Vegas, Nevada, and Dallas, Texas. Some 80 vehicle owners took part in the show. The second series of episodes have included South Jersey and Indiana.

Episodes

Season 1: 2011

Season 2: 2012

Incidents
During filming for a Las Vegas episode of Repo Games, 40-year-old Carlos Barron shot at the show's film crew because the production van was parked outside of his home. He was later arrested for attempted murder. He was sentenced to 90 days in jail and five years of probation on June 24, 2014.

References

External links
495 Productions

2010s American reality television series
2011 American television series debuts
2012 American television series endings
Spike (TV network) original programming
2010s American game shows